Wolf God is the ninth full-length album by Swedish heavy metal band Grand Magus. It was released on April 19, 2019 on Nuclear Blast. Brave Words & Bloody Knuckles honored Wolf God as #20 in the top 30 BravePicks of 2019.

Track listing
"Gold and Glory" (intro) - 2:18
"Wolf God" - 3:49
"A Hall Clad in Gold" - 5:02
"Brother of the Storm" - 3:16
"Dawn of Fire" - 5:12
"Spear Thrower" - 2:55
"To Live and to Die in Solitude" - 3:40
"Glory to the Brave" - 5:15
"He Sent Them All to Hel" - 3:37
"Untamed" - 3:45

References 

Grand Magus albums
2019 albums
Nuclear Blast albums